Departments of Ivory Coast are currently the third-level administrative subdivision of the country. Each of the 31 second-level regions of Ivory Coast is divided into two or more departments. (The autonomous districts are containing departments, but have a specific status.) Each department is divided into two or more sub-prefectures. Since 2020, there are 109 departments of Ivory Coast.

Departments were first created in 1959. During their existence, they have been first-, second-, and third-level administrative subdivisions.

Current departments

There are currently 109 departments of Ivory Coast. The departments are as follows:

History

1961–69

Departments were established in 1961 and were the original first-level administrative subdivision of independent Ivory Coast. Initially, there were just four departments: Centre, Nord, Sud-Est, and Sud-Ouest. In 1963, two more departments were created: Est was created by dividing Sud-Est, and Centre-Ouest) was created by dividing Sud-Ouest. As a result of the divisions, Sud-Est was renamed Sud and Sud-Ouest was renamed Ouest.

1969: 24 new departments
In 1969, the six departments were abolished and in their place 24 new departments were created. The following table illustrates how the old departments were divided into the new departments:

Due to a lack of government resources, the 1969 changes were not fully implemented until 1974.

Subsequent divisions and relegation to second-level
From 1974 onward, new departments were occasionally created through division of pre-existing departments. New departments were created in 1974 (2), 1980 (8), 1988 (15), and 1995 (1). In 1997, when there were 50 departments, regions were created, which supplanted departments as the first-level administrative subdivision. As a result, the 50 departments became second-level divisions.

More departments were created in 1998 (8), 2005 (12), 2008 (11), and 2009 (9). By the time of the late-2011 reorganisation of the subdivisions of Ivory Coast, there were 90 departments in 19 regions.

2011 subdivision reorganisation
In the 2011 reorganisation of the subdivisions of Ivory Coast, five new departments were created, bringing the total to 95. More significantly, however, districts were created as a new first-level division. As a result, regions became second-level subdivisions and the 95 departments became third-level subdivisions.

Post-2011 changes
Since the 2011 reorganisation, 14 more departments have been created, bringing the total number to 109. Twelve departments were created in 2012, one in 2013, and one was created in 2020.

Names and governance
Departments are named after the city or town that serves as the seat of the department. In most cases, this is the most populous settlement in the department.

Each department is headed by a prefect, who is appointed by the council of ministers (cabinet) of the national government. For departments that house regional capitals, the prefect of the department is the same individual as the prefect of the region, though the two offices of prefect remain distinct.

Each department is divided into two or more sub-prefectures, which serve as fourth-level administrative subdivisions. There are currently 510 sub-prefectures in the country.

Current departments by district and region
Below are the departments divided by district and region with the establishment year of the departments in parentheses.

Abidjan Autonomous District
Abidjan Department (1969)

Bas-Sassandra District

Comoé District

Denguélé District

Gôh-Djiboua District

Lacs District

Lagunes District

Montagnes District

Sassandra-Marahoué District

Savanes District

Vallée du Bandama District

Woroba District

Yamoussoukro Autonomous District
 Attiégouakro Department (2009)
 Yamoussoukro Department (1988)

Zanzan District

Defunct departments
There are six departments of Ivory Coast that have been eliminated.

Maps of departments through time

Notes

References
 SATO Akira (2003). "L'évolution historique de la subdivision territoriale administrative en Côte d'Ivoire" in L'administration locale en Côte d'Ivoire. Africa Research Studies 10. 日本貿易振興機構（ジェトロ）アジア経済研究所 / Institute of Developing Economies, Japan External Trade Organization (IDE-JETRO). 2003. On-line.
 TICE Robert D. (1974). "Administrative Structure, Ethnicity, and Nation-Building in the Ivory Coast" in The Journal of Modern African Studies. 12, 2 (1974). pp. 211–29. (Jstor:https://www.jstor.org/stable/159720).
 "Regions of Côte d'Ivoire (Ivory Coast)", statoids.com, accessed 18 February 2016. [Outdated and with many wrong statements compared to Sato (2003) comprehensive study.]
 Carte du nouveau découpage administratif de la Côte-d'Ivoire (novembre 2011). [Outdated.]
 Décret n°2012-612 de 4 juillet 2012 portant creation de la Region du Moronou, page 86.
 Loi n°2012-1128 du 13 décembre 2012 portant organisation des collectivités territoriales

 
Subdivisions of Ivory Coast
Ivory Coast 3
Ivory Coast 3
Departments, Ivory Coast
Ivory Coast geography-related lists
1961 establishments in Ivory Coast